Ulysses S. Grant is a 2002 two-part television documentary film about Ulysses S. Grant, the 18th President of the United States. Produced by PBS for the American Experience documentary program, it recounts Grant's life from his childhood in Ohio to his presidency, with narration by Liev Schreiber. The film was released in two parts on May 5 and 6, 2002, with part one (titled "Warrior") written, produced, and directed by Adriana Bosch, and part two (titled "President") written, produced, and directed by Elizabeth Deane.

Interviewees

David Bradley, writer
Max Byrd, novelist
Dan T. Carter, historian
Mark Grimsley, historian
William S. McFeely, biographer
James M. McPherson, historian
Donald L. Miller, historian
Geoffrey Perret, biographer
John Y. Simon, historian
Brooks D. Simpson, historian
Joan Waugh, historian

Critical response
For the rebroadcast of Ulysses S. Grant: Warrior in 2011, Neil Genzlinger of The New York Times deemed it better than the more recent American Experience film Robert E. Lee, about the titular Confederate general during the American Civil War. Genzlinger reasoned that Grant was a more interesting figure than Lee, and that Ulysses S. Grants light use of reenactments made it a more engaging film than Robert E. Lee, which has none.

Home media
Ulysses S. Grant was first released on VHS by PBS on August 27, 2002. PBS would release the film on DVD by February 15, 2005. Though it is part of The Presidents collection of American Experience, it is not included in the collection's DVD box set released in August 2008.

References

External links
Official PBS site

2002 television films
2002 films
2002 documentary films
American Experience
American documentary television films
Cultural depictions of Ulysses S. Grant
Documentary films about presidents of the United States
Documentary films about the American Civil War
2000s English-language films
2000s American films